Veronaea musae is an ascomycete fungus that is a plant pathogen infecting bananas.

See also 
 List of banana and plantain diseases

References

External links 
 Index Fungorum
 USDA ARS Fungal Database

Fungal plant pathogens and diseases
Banana diseases
Ascomycota enigmatic taxa